Love Me Like That may refer to:

 Love Me Like That (album), an album by Kira Isabella, or the title song
 "Love Me Like That" (R5 song), 2013
 "Love Me Like That" (The Knocks song)